Erdenechimegiin Sumiyaa (born 28 February 1990) is a wrestler from Mongolia. At the 2013 FILA Wrestling World Championships, she won a silver medal in women's 51 kg freestyle.

In 2021, she won the silver medal in the women's 55 kg event at the 2021 Poland Open held in Warsaw, Poland. In 2022, she won one of the bronze medals in the women's 55 kg event at the Golden Grand Prix Ivan Yarygin held in Krasnoyarsk, Russia.

References

External links
 
 
 The nominees for Best Athlete of the Month, May 2012
 8 medals from the Hari Ram Indian Wrestling Grand Prix Tournament (2012)

Mongolian female sport wrestlers
Living people
1990 births
World Wrestling Championships medalists
Wrestlers at the 2016 Summer Olympics
Olympic wrestlers of Mongolia
Universiade medalists in wrestling
Wrestlers at the 2018 Asian Games
Medalists at the 2018 Asian Games
Asian Games bronze medalists for Mongolia
Asian Games medalists in wrestling
Universiade silver medalists for Mongolia
Medalists at the 2013 Summer Universiade
Asian Wrestling Championships medalists
21st-century Mongolian women